Concord Township is an inactive township in Pemiscot County, in the U.S. state of Missouri.

Concord Township takes its name from the community of Concord, Pemiscot County, Missouri.

References

Townships in Missouri
Townships in Pemiscot County, Missouri